Ine Airport is a public use airstrip located in the village of Ine on Arno Atoll, Marshall Islands. This airstrip is assigned the location identifier N20 by the FAA and IMI by the IATA.

Facilities 
Ine Airport is at an elevation of 4 feet (1.2 m) above mean sea level. The runway is designated 08/26 with a coral gravel surface measuring 2,450 by 50 feet (747 x 15 m). There are no aircraft based at Ine.

Airlines and destinations

References

External links
AirNav airport information for N20

Airports in the Marshall Islands